Turners Field is an   nature reserve on the western outskirts of Tenterden in Kent. It is managed by Kent Wildlife Trust.

This field is managed as part of an organic farm, and has grassland, a stream, a pond, scrub and mature woodland. Herbs include pepper saxifrage, black knapweed and bird's-foot trefoil.

There is access from Drury Road.

References

Kent Wildlife Trust
Tenterden